Ali Moradi (also Romanized as ‘Alī Morādī; also known as Ali Morad and ‘Ali Murādi) is a village in Tang Chenar Rural District, in the Central District of Mehriz County, Yazd Province, Iran. In the 2006 census, its population was 79, in 22 families.

References 

Populated places in Mehriz County